Kanata—Carleton is a federal electoral district in Ottawa, Ontario.

Kanata—Carleton was created by the 2012 federal electoral boundaries redistribution and was legally defined in the 2013 representation order. It came into effect upon the call of the 2015 federal election. The new riding contains almost all of the portion of the former Carleton—Mississippi Mills located in Ottawa, except for the portion south of Highway 7/Highway 417 that transferred to Carleton.  A small fraction came from Nepean—Carleton surrounding the Bridlewood neighbourhood.

Geography
The riding covers an area within a boundary defined as follows: Western limit of Ottawa starting at Highway 7. NE along Highway7 to Highway 417. NE along Highway 417 to Maple Grove Road. NE along Maple Grove Road to the Carp River. SE along the Carp River to the SW section of Spearman Lane. NE along Spearman Lane to Terry Fox Drive. SE along Terry Fox to Hope Side Road. NE along Hope Side Road to Richmond Road. N along Richmond Road to West Hunt Club Road. NW to Haanel Drive with Robertson Road. SW along Robertson Road to Eagleson Road. NW along Eagleson Road to March Road, Herzberg Road and March Valley Road to Riddell Road to the interprovincial boundary between Ontario and Quebec. along the boundary to the north limit of the city of Ottawa then SW and SE along the northern and western limits of the city to the point of commencement.

Demographics
According to the Canada 2021 Census
Ethnic groups: 66.4% White, 8.0% Chinese, 7.0% South Asian, 3.8% Black, 3.4% Arab, 3.7% Indigenous, 1.8% Southeast Asian, 1.7% West Asian, 1.3% Latin American, 1.0% Filipino
Languages: 65.4% English, 6.0% French, 4.7% Mandarin, 2.6% Arabic, 1.5% Russian, 1.2% Cantonese, 1.2% Spanish
Religions: 51.2% Christian (26.3% Catholic, 5.4% Anglican, 4.4% United Church, 2.1% Christian Orthodox, 1.2% Presbyterian, 11.8% Other), 7.7% Muslim, 2.6% Hindu, 1.2% Buddhist, 35.1% None.
Median income: $54,400 (2020) 
Average income: $69,100 (2020)

Members of Parliament

This riding has elected the following Members of Parliament:

Election results

References

Ontario federal electoral districts
Federal electoral districts of Ottawa
2013 establishments in Ontario